Sound FC is an American soccer team based in Tacoma, Washington. Founded in 2006, the team most recently played in USL League Two, the fourth tier of the American Soccer Pyramid.

History

2006–2009: Playoffs
The Tacoma team was introduced into the league at very short notice in 2006, when it was announced that the now-defunct Spokane Shadow franchise was suspending operations for the season. During their first season, they were simply referred to as Tacoma FC. Under the leadership of Mike Jennings as head coach, Tacoma finished 5th in the Northwest table, 16 points off the leaders. Rory Agu was the top scorer with 5 goals, while Spencer Schomaker registered 3 assists.

2007 began with a new official name, the Tacoma Tide. By the end of the regular season, Tacoma sat in second place in the Northwest division. Rory Agu was again one of Tide's top marksmen with 7 goals, while MLS-bound Ciaran O'Brien notched an impressive 7 goals and 5 assists.

Tacoma was looking to build on their impressive sophomore season in 2008. The Conference Final saw them face divisional rivals Vancouver Whitecaps Residency for a third time. Tacoma was on the receiving end of a 4–1 final score. Rory Agu and Spencer Schomaker ended the year as Tide's top marksmen, with 11 and 9 goals respectively, with Schomaker also contributing 5 assists.

2009–2010: Playoff-less seasons
O'Brien was replaced as head coach by former Rochester Rhinos and Seattle Sounders midfielder Greg Howes in 2009, and the change in leadership, combined with the excellence of the expansion teams in the Northwest, seemed to affect Tacoma on the field. A 4–3 loss to the Kitsap Pumas on the final day of the season left the Tide in seventh place, a full 20 points behind divisional champions Kitsap, and out of the playoffs for the first time in three years. Rory Agu was again Tacoma's top scorer, hitting the net 11 times, while Leighton O'Brien provided 4 assists.

2010 began with a change in coaching with former Canadian national team player Gerry Gray replacing Greg Howes.  2010 also saw the team acquire several new players, as well as see some players return from other teams. Chris Sanders joined after a stint with FC Nuremberg and Mark Conrad joined from Kitsap Pumas. Raphael Cox rejoined the team after a year with Real Salt Lake and an MLS Championship. With the two playoff spots locked up by Kitsap and Portland the last game of the season against Kitsap was for pride only. The season was nonetheless an improvement from 2009 with the team finishing third and only narrowly missing out on a playoff spot.

2011
In August 2011, ownership of the team was reorganized as the club sought new investors.

2012–2019: Sounders U-23
On January 25, 2012, it was announced that the Tide will re-brand as Seattle Sounders FC U-23.

2020: Sound FC
On January 9, 2020, it was announced that the Seattle Sounders FC had decided to terminate its branding agreement with the club. The club then decided to affiliate with youth club Sound FC. On March 13, 2020, it was announced that Sound FC would not be participating in USL League Two for the 2020 season, with Issaquah-based Sounders youth affiliate Eastside FC taking the team's place in the league instead.

Staff
.

Year-by-year

Honors
 USL PDL Northwest Division Champions 2008
 USL PDL Northwest Division Champions 2012

Head coaches
  Mike Jennings (2006)
  Fran O'Brien (2007–2008)
  Greg Howes (2009)
  Gerry Gray (2010–2011)
  Darren Sawatzky (2012–2018)
  Jason Prenovost (2019–)

Stadia
Sunset Chevrolet Stadium; Sumner, Washington
Franklin Pierce High School; Tacoma, Washington
Cheney Stadium; Tacoma, Washington
Tumwater High School; Tumwater, Washington

References

External links
Official website
Official USL2 website

Seattle Sounders FC
Association football clubs established in 2006
USL League Two teams
Soccer clubs in Washington (state)
2006 establishments in Washington (state)